HMS Mermaid was a cutter built in Howrah, India, in 1816. The British Royal Navy purchased her at Port Jackson in 1817. The Navy then used her to survey the Australian coasts. In 1820 she grounded and in 1823 was condemned for survey work. The Navy sold her to the colonial government which used her to run errands until she was wrecked in 1829.

Career
Mermaid was launched at Howrah in 1816 and the Royal Navy purchased her at Port Jackson in 1817.

Phillip Parker King used her between December 1817 and December 1820 to survey parts of the Australian coast that Matthew Flinders had not already surveyed.
King circumnavigated the Australian mainland and conducted a survey of the Inner Route through the Great Barrier Reef. 

In 1820 Mermaid grounded at Careening Bay, Kimberley, Western Australia; gotten off, she only reached Sydney with difficulty. A survey resulted in her condemnation for survey work and her sale in 1823 to the colonial government.

In September 1823 Mermaid carried John Oxley as he explored the Queensland coast south of Port Curtis, discovering the Brisbane and Tweed rivers. At Moreton Bay he rescued Thomas Pamphlett and John Finnegan, who had been ship-wrecked earlier in the year.

In September 1825 Mermaid transported Edmund Lockyer to Moreton Bay so he could explore the upper reaches of the Brisbane River.

In August 1826 John Richardson travelled on Mermaid from Fort Dundas, on Melville Island, to Timor to obtain seeds.

Around 1829 the ship was rigged as a two-masted schooner.

Loss
Captain Samuel Nolbrow and Mermaid departed Sydney on 16 May 1829, bound for Port Raffles with government dispatches and provisions for King George's Sound. She proceeded on the inner passage to Torres Straits. At 6 a.m. on 13 June she struck an uncharted reef on the southern side of Flora Reef, Queensland. She bilged and her crew abandoned her that evening with no loss of life.

Post-script
An underwater archaeology team led by the Australian National Maritime Museum in early 2009 rediscovered the wreck.

See also
 King Expedition of 1817

Citations and references
Citations

References
 
 Nicholson, Ian Hawkins (1996) Via Torres Strait – A maritime history of the Torres Strait route and the ship's post office at Booby Island. (Roebuck Society Publication No.48).

External links
 

 

Cutters of the Royal Navy
Shipwrecks of Queensland
Australian Shipwrecks with protected zone